The 1955 Tangerine Bowl was an American college football bowl game played after the 1954 season, on January 1, 1955, at the Tangerine Bowl stadium in Orlando, Florida.  The Omaha Indians (today's Omaha Mavericks, who no longer have a football team) defeated the Eastern Kentucky Maroons (now the Eastern Kentucky Colonels) by a score of 7–6.

Game summary
Omaha scored on a 30-yard pass play in the first quarter, with Bill Englehardt both throwing the touchdown pass and then kicking the extra point. Eastern Kentucky answered with a touchdown in the second quarter, but the extra point was missed, leaving the score 7–6 at halftime. After a scoreless second half, the missed extra point proved to be the difference in the game. Englehardt was named the game's MVP.

Scoring summary

Statistics

References

Further reading
 
  (video)

External links
 1955 Tangerine Bowl Digital Collection from the University of Nebraska Omaha Dr. C.C. and Mabel L. Criss Library

Tangerine Bowl
Citrus Bowl (game)
Eastern Kentucky Colonels football bowl games
Nebraska–Omaha Mavericks football bowl games
Tangerine Bowl
Tangerine Bowl